1935 in the Philippines details events of note that happened in the Philippines in 1935

Incumbents

 President: Manuel Quezon (Nacionalista Party) (starting November 15)
 Vice President: Sergio Osmeña (Nacionalista Party) (starting November 15)
 Chief Justice: Ramón Avanceña
 Philippine National Assembly: 1st National Assembly of the Philippines (starting November 25)

Events

February
 February 8 – The Constitutional Convention creates a new constitution.
 February 15 – The Philippine Constitution is signed.

May
 May 2 – The Sakdalista uprising.
 May 14 – The Philippine electorates ratify the Constitution in a referendum.

September
 September 17 – Manuel Quezon is elected as President in the first Philippine Presidential elections.

November
 November 15 
 The Philippine Commonwealth is inaugurated.
 The Office of Civil Governor is abolished.

Holidays

As per Act No. 2711 section 29, issued on March 10, 1917, any legal holiday of fixed date falls on Sunday, the next succeeding day shall be observed as legal holiday. Sundays are also considered legal religious holidays. Bonifacio Day was added through Philippine Legislature Act No. 2946. It was signed by then-Governor General Francis Burton Harrison in 1921. On October 28, 1931, the Act No. 3827 was approved declaring the last Sunday of August as National Heroes Day.

 January 1 – New Year's Day
 February 22 – Legal Holiday
 April 18 – Maundy Thursday
 April 19 – Good Friday
 May 1 – Labor Day
 July 4 – Philippine Republic Day
 August 13  – Legal Holiday
 August 25 – National Heroes Day
 November 28 – Thanksgiving Day
 November 30 – Bonifacio Day
 December 25 – Christmas Day
 December 30 – Rizal Day

Births
January 3 – Lilia Cuntapay, actress (d. 2016)
January 17: 
Sergio Apostol, politician.
John Henry Osmeña, politician
February 11 – Lourdes Libres Rosaroso, radio broadcaster (d. 2010)
February 15 – Cristobal Ramas, basketball player
March 23 – Juanita Amatong, member of the Monetary Board of the Philippines
March 25 – Gabriel Elorde, professional boxer. (d. 1985)
March 26 – Ernesto Maceda, politician, lawyer, and columnist (d. 2016)
April 14 – Rodolfo Biazon, politician
April 16 – Mely Tagasa, actress, screenwriter and dubbing producer (d. 2018)
April 25 – Aniano A. Desierto, judge
June 7 – Roberto Yburan, Olympic basketball player
June 10 – Eduardo Cojuangco, Jr., politician (d. 2020)
June 17 – Simeon Datumanong, politician (d. 2017)
June 23 – Juan Flavier, politician (d. 2014)
June 27 – Ramon Zamora, film actor (d. 2007)
June 29 – Pedro Romualdo, politician. (d. 2013)
July 4 – Cielito del Mundo, host (d. 2016)
July 13 – Eduardo Ermita, Executive Secretary of the Philippines
August 16 – Carlos Badion, basketball player. (d. 2002)
August 29 – Luis Villafuerte, politician
September 1 – Mel Lopez, politician (d. 2017)
September 17 – Romeo A. Brawner, public official (d. 2008)
September 21 – Benjamin Abalos, politician
October 6 – Charito Solís, actress (d. 1998)
October 19 – Samuel Dangwa, politician.
October 20 – Resurreccion Borra, former COMELEC chairman (d. 2020)
November 25: 
Edgar Bond, sports shooter
Leonardo Legaspi, Archbishop Emeritus of the Roman Catholic Archdiocese of Caceres (d. 2014)
December 12 – Epimaco Velasco, politician. (d. 2014)
December 20 – Hilario Davide, Jr., former chief justice

Births unknown
Orly Punzalan, broadcaster
Carding Castro, actor (d. 2003)
Don Pepot, Filipino comedian.
Raul Gonzalez, journalist.

Death
 September 20 - Julio Nalundasan, Member of the Philippine House of Representatives from Ilocos Norte's Second District (b. 1894)

References